"Run" is a song by British musical duo Lighthouse Family, released as the second single from their third studio album, Whatever Gets You Through the Day (2001). The song was produced by Kevin Bacon and Jonathan Quarmby. It was released on 25 February 2002 and reached the top 30 in the United Kingdom as well as number two in the Czech Republic.

Chart performance
After the release of "Run" in the United Kingdom, it reached number 30 on the UK Singles Chart and stayed in the charts for three weeks. In Switzerland and Austria, "Run" reached numbers 71 and 75, respectively. In the Czech Republic, the song peaked at number two.

Track listings
 UK CD1
 "Run" (radio edit) — 3:40
 "Run" (Ernest Saint Laurent Mix) — 6:25
 "Run" (Agent Sumo Mix) — 9:20
 "Run" (video)

 UK CD2
 "Run" (radio edit) — 3:40
 "(I Wish I Knew How It Would Feel to Be) Free/One" (Mutiny Vocal Mix) — 7:10
 "(I Wish I Knew How it Would Feel to Be) Free/One" (Brother Brown Main Mix) — 8:06

 UK cassette single and European CD single
 "Run" (radio edit) — 3:40
 "Run" (D'Influence vocal mix) — 4:55

 Australian CD single
 "Run" (radio edit) — 3:40
 "Run" (D'Influence vocal mix) — 4:55
 "Wish" (acoustic version) — 5:09
 "Run" (CD ROM video)

Charts

References

2002 singles
Lighthouse Family songs
Song recordings produced by Jonathan Quarmby
Song recordings produced by Kevin Bacon (producer)
Songs written by Paul Tucker (musician)